South Kalgoorlie is a residential suburb of Kalgoorlie-Boulder, a city in the Eastern Goldfields region of Western Australia.

It contains Kalgoorlie-Boulder Community High School and John Paul College, Kalgoorlie.

References